The 1986 WAFL season was the 102nd season of the various incarnations of the West Australian Football League. It was the last season before the introduction of the West Coast Eagles in the VFL which would relegate the WAFL to a second-level league from 1987, and already all WAFL clubs were in severe financial difficulties as attendances were stagnant at best since 1970 and the financial power of wealthy VFL clubs drew most top players away and left below-market transfer fees as WAFL clubs’ inadequate main income source.

There was also controversy over an attempt to play the Round 7 match between West Perth and Claremont on Mother's Day (11 May) which was vigorously opposed by young families, and the game was played on the Saturday, and the WAFL admitted mid-season that changes to its schedules with more matches in major rural centres and matches at night at the WACA were needed to counter the competition's dwindling appeal. WAFL chairman Roy Annear initially proposed to play two games a season in large towns like Geraldton, Bunbury and Kalgoorlie, although in modern times games in rural areas have been spread out to smaller centres at a lower frequency.

On the field, 1986 saw financially crippled Perth, whose reserves had in 1985 made the Demons’ first finals appearance in any grade since 1978, build upon this under Mal Brown to reach the preliminary final. The loss of players to the VFL, however, prevented Perth building upon this in subsequent seasons and they have remained almost continuously a cellar-dweller since. East Fremantle and Subiaco, clearly the best teams in 1985, were even more dominant in 1986, though there was an unexpected end when hot favourites East Fremantle were thrashed in the Grand Final. Claremont, disappointing in 1984 and 1985, were spectacular early in 1986 before injuries to key players and form lapses saw a catastrophic fall from second with seven straight defeats.

Swan Districts, who had achieve a mini-dynasty from 1980 to 1984 with 88 wins from 118 matches, declined from third to their fourteenth wooden spoon, as injuries to key players and loss of form by veteran Kevin Taylor could only rarely be covered. South Fremantle, possessing the severest financial problems in the WAFL, also suffered from clouds over Don Haddow's coaching future and disputes with the Fremantle Council over Fremantle Oval producing proposals the Bulldogs move to a multi-sport stadium in Cockburn. The Bulldogs suffered their worst season since 1972 and held no opponent under 100 points until the closing round.

Clubs

Home-and-away season

Round 1 (Easter weekend)

Round 2

Round 3

Round 4

Round 5 (Anzac Day)

Round 6

Round 7

Round 8

Round 9

Round 10 (Foundation Day)

Round 11

Round 12

Round 13

Round 14

Round 15

State of Origin match

Round 16

Round 17

Round 18

Round 19

Round 20

Round 21

Ladder

Finals series

First semi-final

Second semi-final

Preliminary final

Grand Final

Notes
As of 1986, the WACA had not been used for any WA(N)FL match since Perth ceased playing its home games there at the end of the 1958 season.In Round 17 of 1944 East Fremantle beat a winless under-19 South Fremantle team by 201 points.Their lone win during 1982 was against East Fremantle.

References

External links
Official WAFL website
West Australian Football League (WAFL), 1986

West Australian Football League seasons
WAFL